Dobrače may refer to:
Dobrače (Arilje), a village in municipality of Arilje in Serbia
Dobrače (Rogatica), a village in municipality of Rogatica in Bosnia and Herzegovina